Nabis alternatus, the western damsel bug, is a species of damsel bug in the family Nabidae. It is found in Central America and North America.

Subspecies
These two subspecies belong to the species Nabis alternatus:
 Nabis alternatus alternatus Parshley, 1922
 Nabis alternatus uniformis Harris, 1928

References

Further reading

 

Nabidae
Articles created by Qbugbot
Insects described in 1922